Woodlawn is an unincorporated community in Nemaha County, Kansas, United States.

History
Woodlawn was founded in 1881.

A post office was opened in Woodlawn in 1881, and remained in operation until it was discontinued in 1906.

References

Further reading

External links
 Nemaha County maps: Current, Historic, KDOT

Unincorporated communities in Nemaha County, Kansas
Unincorporated communities in Kansas
1881 establishments in Kansas
Populated places established in 1881